The , officially the  is the Japanese aerial lift line in Naeba, Yuzawa, Niigata, operated by Prince Hotels. It opened in 2001. The line was named by Yumi Matsutōya, a popular pop singer. The line links two ski resorts of Prince Hotels, but the line operates in summer and autumn as well. Its official website states it is the longest gondola lift line in the world.

Basic data
Distance: 
Vertical interval: 
Operational speed: 6 m/s
System: Gondola lift
Cabins: 107
Passenger capacity per a cabin: 8
Time required for single ride: 15 minutes

See also
List of aerial lifts in Japan

Notes

External links
 Official website

Gondola lifts in Japan
2001 establishments in Japan